The Myth of Sisyphus is a 1942 philosophical essay by Albert Camus. 

Influenced by philosophers such as Søren Kierkegaard, Arthur Schopenhauer, and Friedrich Nietzsche, Camus introduces his philosophy of the absurd. The absurd lies in the juxtaposition between the fundamental human need to attribute meaning to life and the "unreasonable silence" of the universe in response. Camus claims that the realization of the absurd does not justify suicide, and instead requires "revolt." He then outlines several approaches to the absurd life. In the final chapter, Camus compares the absurdity of man's life with the situation of Sisyphus, a figure of Greek mythology who was condemned to repeat forever the same meaningless task of pushing a boulder up a mountain, only to see it roll down again. The essay concludes, "The struggle itself ... is enough to fill a man's heart. One must imagine Sisyphus happy".

The work can be seen in relation to other absurdist works by Camus: the novel The Stranger (1942), the plays The Misunderstanding (1942) and Caligula (1944), and especially the essay The Rebel (1951).

History
Camus began the work in 1940, during the fall of France, when millions of refugees fled from advancing German armies. While the essay rarely refers to this event, Robert Zaretsky argues that the event prompted his ideas of the absurd. He claims that both a banal event and something as intense as a German invasion will prompt someone to ask "why?". The essay was published in French in 1942.

The English translation by Justin O'Brien was first published in 1955. Included in the translated version is a preface written by Camus while in Paris in 1955. Here Camus states that "even if one does not believe in God, suicide is not legitimate".

Summary
The essay is dedicated to Pascal Pia and is organized in four chapters and one appendix.

Chapter 1: An Absurd Reasoning
Camus undertakes the task of answering what he considers to be the only question of philosophy that matters: Does the realization of the meaninglessness and absurdity of life necessarily require suicide?

He begins by describing the following absurd condition: we build our life on the hope for tomorrow, yet tomorrow brings us closer to death and is the ultimate enemy; people live their lives as if they were not aware of the certainty of death. Once stripped of its common romanticism, the world is a foreign, strange and inhuman place; true knowledge is impossible and rationality and science cannot explain the world: their stories ultimately end in meaningless abstractions, in metaphors. This is the absurd condition and "from the moment absurdity is recognized, it becomes a passion, the most harrowing of all."
 
It is not the world that is absurd, nor human thought: the absurd arises when the human need to understand meets the unreasonableness of the world, when the "appetite for the absolute and for unity" meets "the impossibility of reducing this world to a rational and reasonable principle."

He then characterizes several philosophies that describe and attempt to deal with this feeling of the absurd, by Martin Heidegger, Karl Jaspers, Lev Shestov, Søren Kierkegaard, and Edmund Husserl. All of these, he claims, commit "philosophical suicide" by reaching conclusions that contradict the original absurd position, either by abandoning reason and turning to God, as in the case of Kierkegaard and Shestov, or by elevating reason and ultimately arriving at ubiquitous Platonic forms and an abstract god, as in the case of Husserl.

For Camus, who sets out to take the absurd seriously and follow it to its final conclusions, these "leaps" cannot convince. Taking the absurd seriously means acknowledging the contradiction between the desire of human reason and the unreasonable world. Suicide, then, also must be rejected: without man, the absurd cannot exist. The contradiction must be lived; reason and its limits must be acknowledged, without false hope. However, the absurd can never be permanently accepted: it requires constant confrontation, constant revolt.

While the question of human freedom in the metaphysical sense loses interest to the absurd man, he gains freedom in a very concrete sense: no longer bound by hope for a better future or eternity, without a need to pursue life's purpose or to create meaning, "he enjoys a freedom with regard to common rules".

To embrace the absurd implies embracing all that the unreasonable world has to offer. Without meaning in life, there is no scale of values. "What counts is not the best living but the most living."

Thus, Camus arrives at three consequences from fully acknowledging the absurd: revolt, freedom, and passion.

Chapter 2: The Absurd Man
How should the absurd man live? Clearly, no ethical rules apply, as they are all based on higher powers or on justification. "...integrity has no need of rules... 'Everything is permitted,'... is not an outburst of relief or of joy, but rather a bitter acknowledgement of a fact."

Camus then goes on to present examples of the absurd life. He begins with Don Juan, the serial seducer who lives the passionate life to the fullest. "There is no noble love but that which recognizes itself to be both short-lived and exceptional."

The next example is the actor, who depicts ephemeral lives for ephemeral fame. "He demonstrates to what degree appearing creates being. In those three hours, he travels the whole course of the dead-end path that the man in the audience takes a lifetime to cover."

Camus's third example of the absurd man is the conqueror, the warrior who forgoes all promises of eternity to affect and engage fully in human history. He chooses action over contemplation, aware of the fact that nothing can last and no victory is final.

Chapter 3: Absurd Creation
Here Camus explores the absurd creator or artist.  Since explanation is impossible, absurd art is restricted to a description of the myriad experiences in the world. "If the world were clear, art would not exist." Absurd creation, of course, also must refrain from judging and from alluding to even the slightest shadow of hope.

He then analyzes the work of Fyodor Dostoevsky in this light, especially The Diary of a Writer,  The Possessed and The Brothers Karamazov. All these works start from the absurd position, and the first two explore the theme of philosophical suicide. However, both The Diary and his last novel, The Brothers Karamazov, ultimately find a path to hope and faith and thus fail as truly absurd creations.

Chapter 4: The Myth of Sisyphus
In the last chapter, Camus outlines the legend of Sisyphus who defied the gods and put Death in chains so that no human needed to die. When Death was eventually liberated and it came time for Sisyphus himself to die, he concocted a deceit which let him escape from the underworld. After finally capturing Sisyphus, the gods decided that his punishment would last for all eternity. He would have to push a rock up a mountain; upon reaching the top, the rock would roll down again, leaving Sisyphus to start over. Camus sees Sisyphus as the absurd hero who lives life to the fullest, hates death, and is condemned to a meaningless task.

Camus presents Sisyphus's ceaseless and pointless toil as a metaphor for modern lives spent working at futile jobs in factories and offices. "The workman of today works every day in his life at the same tasks, and this fate is no less absurd. But it is tragic only at the rare moments when it becomes conscious."

Camus is interested in Sisyphus's thoughts when marching down the mountain, to start anew. After the stone falls back down the mountain Camus states that "It is during that return, that pause, that Sisyphus interests me. A face that toils so close to stones is already stone itself! I see that man going back down with a heavy yet measured step toward the torment of which he will never know the end." This is the truly tragic moment when the hero becomes conscious of his wretched condition. He does not have hope, but "there is no fate that cannot be surmounted by scorn." Acknowledging the truth will conquer it; Sisyphus, just like the absurd man, continues pushing. Camus claims that when Sisyphus acknowledges the futility of his task and the certainty of his fate, he is freed to realize the absurdity of his situation and to reach a state of contented acceptance.  With a nod to the similarly cursed Greek hero Oedipus, Camus concludes that "all is well," indeed, that "one must imagine Sisyphus happy."

Appendix
The essay contains an appendix titled "Hope and the Absurd in the work of Franz Kafka". While Camus acknowledges that Kafka's work represents an exquisite description of the absurd condition, he mentions that Kafka fails as an absurd writer because his work retains a glimmer of hope.

Myth
Inspired by Greek mythology, Camus makes the connection between life as an eternal beginning obedient to the absurd and Sisyphus, hero of Greek mythology. Why such a punishment? Camus cites several versions of the myth, most of which explain Sisyphus' punishment by insulting the gods. A particular version lends to Sisyphus, dying, the will to feel the love of his wife by asking her not to give him a burial and to throw his body in the public square, after his death. According to another version, Sisyphus discovers the affair between the ruler of Olympus, Zeus, and Aegina; he goes to monetize the information with the father, the Asopus River. In exchange for his revelation, he received a fountain for his citadel. His too-much insight irritates the gods who condemn him to push a rock to the top of a mountain, which inevitably rolls towards the valley before the hero's goal is achieved.

Unlike the Sisyphus usually presented in mythology, Camus considers that "one must imagine Sisyphus happy", a formula of Shūzō Kuki. Sisyphus finds happiness in the accomplishment of the task he undertakes and not in the meaning of this task.

Sisyphus teaches the higher fidelity that negates the gods and raises rocks. He too concludes that all is well. This universe now without a master seems to him neither sterile nor fertile. Each atom of that stone, each mineral flake of this mountain full of night, alone forms a world. The struggle itself to the heights is enough to fill a man's heart. One must imagine Sisyphus happy. 

Although he based his reasoning on numerous philosophical treatises and the work of novelists such as Dostoevsky and Kafka, many intellectuals of the time insinuated that he had "not read the authors he quotes". He nevertheless argues that happiness is about living one's life while being aware of its absurdity because consciousness allows us to better control our existence. This attitude towards fate could be compared to Spinoza's.

See also
 Eternal return
 Theatre of the Absurd
 The Sickness Unto Death by Søren Kierkegaard

References

Sources
 The Plague, The Fall, Exile and the Kingdom, and Selected Essays, Albert Camus, Alfred A. Knopf 2004,

External links
 Complete original text (French)
 English text
 Chapter 4 of the essay The Myth of Sisyphus, by Albert Camus
 SparkNotes on The Myth of Sisyphus
  by Richard Barnett

1942 non-fiction books
1942 essays
Books about metaphors
Books with atheism-related themes
Éditions Gallimard books
Essays by Albert Camus
French non-fiction books
Hamish Hamilton books
Philosophy essays